Hue University of Medicine and Pharmacy was founded on March 28, 1957. Before 1975, only 200 medical doctors (MDs) graduated. For the first 50 years, the school has educated and trained more than 9,000 Medical Doctors, Doctor of Pharmacy (Pharm.D.), and more than 3,000 Post-Graduates.

References

Medical schools in Vietnam